WMAH may refer to:

 WMAH-FM, a radio station (90.3 FM) licensed to Biloxi, Mississippi, United States
 WMAH-TV, a television station (channel 19 analog/16 digital) licensed to Biloxi, Mississippi, United States